Phace (real name Florian Harres, born 7 March) fka DJ Energize fka Bluescreen is a German music producer, DJ and label owner living in Hamburg, Germany. Influenced by bands and artists such as Kraftwerk, Tangerine Dream, The Prodigy, Photek, Thomas Bangalter, Miles Davis, Optical and Konflict, he is known for his state of the art, futuristic, and distinct sound-design and songwriting. He records music both with analog and digital equipment in his studio in Hamburg Altona.

He produces a wide variety of music, mainly drum and bass, but also electro, halftempo, bass, beats and techno and scores music for film and videogames. He co-owns two record labels: Neosignal and NËU, and has released on several other labels including Skrillex's OWSLA, Deadmau5's Mau5trap, Kitsuné, Noisia's 'Vision' and Division and has performed at international music festivals such as EDC, Beyond Wonderland, Let it Roll, UAF, Outlook, Dour, Fusion, Boomtown etc.

He is also one half of the German electronic band project Neosignal (together with Michael Bräuninger/Misanthrop). They debuted their electro audio-visual live show (based on Ableton Live) at London's legendary Fabric Night Club in 2013.

At the start of his international career he was voted Germany's "Best Drum and Bass DJ & Producer" at the Future Music Awards in 2006. His debut album PSYCHO, released in 2007 on Subtitles Music imprint, was voted Album of the Month in the British Mixmag Magazine. To the present he released 5 full-length studio albums and is regarded as a ground breaking figure of bass-focused electronic music. His 2018 album BETWEEN, released on his own label Neosignal Recordings, was again listed Album of the Month in Mixmag Magazine in August 2018.

In 2019 Phace released a series of collaborations with other artists under the LINKED banner on Neosignal, and released a new solo EP entitled CAGED on Noisia's Vision Recordings in 2020. In 2021, he reinstated the LINKED series with five new singles to date, and released the mini-album System Irrelevant on Neosignal in December.

Discography

Albums

As Phace
 Psycho (2007)		
 From Deep Space (2009)		
 Shape The Random (2015)
 Between (2018)
 System Irrelevant (2021)

As Neosignal
 Raum und Zeit (2013)

Singles and extended plays

As Phace
 Fraxion (2003)		
 Hot Rock / Moore's Law (2005)		
 Dead Air (2005)		
 Brainwave / Polymers (2005)*
 Now & Tomorrow (2005)		
 Cavity (2006)		
 Confront (2006)		
 Homeworld / Outsource (2006)		
 Psycho (Album Sampler) (2006)		
 Deep Throat (2006)		
 Off Center (2007)		
 Crocker (2007)			
 Love Sex Pain (2007)		
 Hot Rock (VIP) / Brainwave (VIP) (2008)		
 Strech Pack / Life Goes (2008)		
 Animal / Zeitgeist (2008)		
 Sculptured / Frozen (2008)		
 Cold Champagne / Astral Projection (2008)		
 Mammoth / Sore Point (2009)		
 Alive (2008)	
 Fortune / Hyzer (2008)		
 CCTV (2009)		
 Desert Orgy / Stagger (2010)		
 Absurd (2010)		
 Energie EP Part I + II + III (2011)		
 Lightyears Apart (2011)
 Program (2011)		
 Basic Memory (2011)		
 Stresstest (2012)		
 Progression / Système Mécanique (2012)		
 Motor EP Part I + II (2013)		
 Vitreous EP (2013)		
 Sex Sells (2014)		
 Impuls(2014)
 Phace And Friends EP (2015)		
 Shape The Random / Album Sampler Part I+ II (2015)		
 So Excited / Lit Up (2016)		
 Plastic Acid (2017)
 Wastemen (2017)
 Consonance / Locust (2018)
 FMS (2018)
 Das Techno (2018)
 Downgrade (2018)
 Isolated (2018)
 Deep Down (with Noisia) (2018)
 Ruhestoerung / Nervenkitzel (with Mefjus) (2019)
 Non-Responsive (with Noisia) (2019)
 For Good / Oh Dear (with Subtension) (2020)
 Caged (2020)
 Ghettoshit (with Submarine) (2021)
 MODE 101 (with Kemal) (2021)
 IDLE (with Buunshin) (2021)
 PLAISIR PLAISIR (with Affe Maria) (2021)
 МЕХАНИЗМ (with Synergy) (2021)

As Neosignal
 Planet Online (2013)	
 Sequenz (2013)
 1000 Volt (2014)	
 Space Gsus (2014)

Miscellaneous
 Blacksmoker (2004)		
 Teufelswerk (2011)

Remixes

As Phace
 Cyb Org - Final Transmission (2005)		
 Cern - Satellites (2008)		
 Proktah - Labyrinth (2007)		
 Cause 4 Concern - Phatcap (2008)		
 The Green Man - Berlin (2009)		
 Hadouken! - M.A.D. (2009)		
 Jade - Cryptic (2009)		
 Panic Girl - Burn And Rise (2011)		
 Pilotpriest - Bodydouble (2011)		
 Black Sun Empire - B'Negative (2013)		
 Rawtekk - Photone Recruits (2014)		
 I Am Legion - Warp Speed Thuggin' (2014)		
 Icicle - Dreadnaught (2015) 
 Program VIP (2016)
 Noisia - Miniatures (2017)
 Culprate - Helter (2020)

As Neosignal
 Rockwell - Childhood Memories (2012)		
 Noisia - Stigma (2012)		
 Koan Sound - Eastern Thug (2012)		
 Beataucue - Aeropolis (2013)		
 Le Castle Vania - Prophication Remixes (2014)

References

Year of birth missing (living people)
Living people
German record producers
German DJs
Musicians from Hamburg
Electronic dance music DJs